Mirosław Pietrewicz (2 January 1941 – 6 May 2022) was a Polish politician. A member of the Polish People's Party, he served as Deputy Prime Minister and Minister of State Treasury from 1996 to 1997. He also served in the Sejm from 1997 to 2001. He died in Warsaw on 6 May 2022 at the age of 81.

References

1941 births
2022 deaths
Members of the Polish Sejm 1997–2001
Government ministers of Poland
Deputy Prime Ministers of Poland
Polish People's Party politicians
SGH Warsaw School of Economics alumni
Academic staff of the SGH Warsaw School of Economics
People from Podlaskie Voivodeship